The National Weather Service Buffalo, New York is a local office of the National Weather Service responsible for monitoring weather conditions in Western New York and other portions of upstate, downwind from Lake Erie and Lake Ontario. It is based on the premises of Buffalo Niagara International Airport in Cheektowaga. The territory covers the cities of Buffalo, Rochester, Geneva, Fulton, and Watertown. Much of the office's work focuses on lake-effect snow.

Jurisdictions served

Counties
Allegany
Cattaraugus
Cayuga
Chautauqua
Erie
Genesee
Jefferson
Lewis
Livingston
Monroe
Niagara 
Chautauqua
Orleans
Oswego
Seneca
St. Lawrence
Wayne
Wyoming
Yates

Cities
Buffalo
Rochester
Geneva
Fulton
Watertown
Niagara Falls

NOAA Weather Radio

The National Weather Service Buffalo, New York forecast office provides programming for seven NOAA Weather Radio stations in New York.

References

External links
 NWS Buffalo's website

Buffalo, New York
Organizations based in Buffalo, New York